The Battle of Rudniki Forest was a period of anti-German partisan activity carried out on behalf of Lithuanian Partisans in the vicinity of Vilna during 1944 and 1945.

Activities included acts of sabotage such as destroying electrical and municipal infrastructure as well as armed raids and ambushes against the Germans and revenge attacks against hostile locals like the Koniuchy massacre.

References

Lithuanian Resistance in World War II
Jewish Lithuanian history
Resistance in Lithuania
Rudniki Forest